The women's 63 kilograms weightlifting event was the fourth women's event at the weightlifting competition, with competitors limited to a maximum of 63 kilograms of body mass. The whole competition took place on August 12, but was divided in two parts due to the number of competitors. Group B weightlifters competed at 12:30, and Group A, at 15:30. This event was the sixth Weightlifting event to conclude.

Each lifter performed in both the snatch and clean and jerk lifts, with the final score being the sum of the lifter's best result in each. The athlete received three attempts in each of the two lifts; the score for the lift was the heaviest weight successfully lifted.

Schedule
All times are China Standard Time (UTC+8)

Records

Results

 Irina Nekrassova of Kazakhstan originally finished second, but was disqualified after she tested positive for stanozolol.

References

 Page 2638

Weightlifting at the 2008 Summer Olympics
Women's events at the 2008 Summer Olympics
Olymp